William Chen (born 1970 in Williamsburg, Virginia) is an American quantitative analyst, poker player, software designer, and badminton player.

Biography
Chen holds a Ph.D. in mathematics (1999) from the University of California, Berkeley. He was an undergraduate at Washington University in St. Louis triple-majoring in Physics, Math, and Computer Science, and was also a research intern in Washington University's Computer Science SURA Program where he co-wrote a technical report inventing an Argument Game.  He heads the Statistical arbitrage department at Susquehanna International Group.

Poker career
At the 2006 World Series of Poker Chen won two events, a $3,000 limit Texas hold 'em event with a prize of $343,618, and a $2,500 no limit hold 'em short-handed event with a prize of $442,511.  Prior to these events Chen's largest tournament win was for $41,600 at a no limit hold 'em  event at the Bicycle Casino's Legends of Poker in 2000.

Chen has been a longtime participant in the rec.gambling.poker newsgroup and its B.A.R.G.E offshoot. He has also been a member of Team PokerStars.

With Jerrod Ankenman, Chen coauthored The Mathematics of Poker, an introduction to quantitative techniques and game theory as applied to poker.

As of 2017, his total live tournament winnings exceed $1,900,000. His 38 cashes at the WSOP account for over $1,725,000 of those winnings.

World Series of Poker bracelets

Bibliography

References

20th-century American mathematicians
21st-century American mathematicians
American poker players
American people of Chinese descent
American computer programmers
UC Berkeley College of Letters and Science alumni
Washington University in St. Louis alumni
Washington University physicists
Living people
World Series of Poker bracelet winners
1970 births
Auburn High School (Alabama) alumni